William Robert Wyman,  (1930 – June 11, 2007) was a Canadian businessman and Chancellor of the University of British Columbia from 1984 to 1987.

Born in Edmonton, Alberta, Wyman received a Bachelor of Commerce degree from the University of British Columbia in 1956. He started his career as an analyst in the investment department of Canada Life Assurance Company. In 1962, he joined Pemberton Securities Inc. as a manager in the research department. He would rise to become president and CEO in 1975 and chairman in 1982. From 1991 to 1992, he was chairman and CEO of B.C. Hydro and Power Authority. He was also a Vice Chairman and Director of RBC Dominion Securities. From 1984 to 1987, he was the Chancellor of the University of British Columbia.

In 2003, he was made a Member of the Order of Canada in recognition for being "a prominent advocate for corporate social responsibility".

References

1930 births
2007 deaths
Businesspeople from Edmonton
Chancellors of the University of British Columbia
Members of the Order of Canada
UBC Sauder School of Business alumni
20th-century Canadian businesspeople